Elections to Liverpool Town Council were held on Friday 1 November 1850. One third of the council seats were up for election, the term of office of each councillor being three years.

Eight of the sixteen wards were uncontested.

After the election, the composition of the council was:

Election result

Ward results

* – Retiring Councillor seeking re-election

Abercromby

Castle Street

Everton

Exchange

Great George

Lime Street

North Toxteth

Pitt Street

Rodney Street

St. Anne Street

St. Paul's

St. Peter's

Scotland

South Toxteth

Vauxhall

West Derby

Aldermanic Elections

On 9 November 1850, the term of office of eight aldermen who were elected on 9 November 1844 expired.

The following were elected as Aldermen by the council on 9 November 1850 for a term of office of six years.

* – re-elected Alderman.

By-elections

No. 10, Rodney Street, 1 November 1950

A signed declaration, dated 27 October 1850, from Councillors Bernard Hall, Thomas Wagstaff and John Charles Fernihough was submitted to the council on 29 October 1850 stating that Councillor George Booker (Conservative, Rodney Street, elected 1 November 1848) had been absent from the borough for more than six months.
This disqualified Councillor Booker and initiated the by election.

No. 1, Everton, 15 November 1850

Caused by the election of Councillor Edward Langsdale (Reformer, Everton, elected 1 November 1848) as an alderman by the council on 9 November 1850.

No. 3, Vauxhall, 15 November 1850

Caused by the election of Councillor William Preston (Reformer, Vauxhall, elected 1 November 1850) as an alderman by the council on 9 November 1850.

No. 8, Pitt Street, 15 November 1850

Caused by the election of Councillor Thomas Robinson (Conservative, Pitt Street, elected 1 November 1848) as an alderman by the council on 9 November 1850.

No. 13, St. Anne Street, 15 November 1850

Caused by the election of Cllr. William Bennett (Conservative, St. Anne Street, elected 1 November 1849) as an alderman by the council on 9 November 1849.

No. 7, St. Peter's, 4 August 1851

Caused by the death of Councillor John Ferguson (Conservative, elected 1 November 1848).

See also
Liverpool Town Council elections 1835 – 1879
Liverpool City Council elections 1880–present
Mayors and Lord Mayors of Liverpool 1207 to present
History of local government in England

References

1850
1850 English local elections
November 1850 events
1850s in Liverpool